Izraf Iffarul bin Roslan (born 9 January 1992) is Malaysian footballer who plays for Kuching City as a defender.

References

External links
 

1992 births
Living people
Malaysian footballers
Sarawak FA players
Kuching City F.C. players
Malaysia Premier League players
Malaysia Super League players
Association football defenders